The Australian-Croatian Soccer Tournament is a tournament run by the Croatian Soccer Federation of Australia and New Zealand, an organisation founded in 1974. The inspiration for the tournament came from the successful Croatian-North American Soccer Tournament founded in 1964. The Australian tournament kicked off in 1974 with an event staged in Melbourne, Australia where six soccer clubs participated at Melbourne Croatia's ground Montgomery Park in Essendon. The tournament was born. Although only six clubs participated, it was the beginning, a beginning spawned from Croatia Melbourne's expulsion from the Victorian Soccer Federation, with the clubs leadership including Tony Vrzina and Josip Solic together with Mirko Furjanic the now Honorary President of the Australian Croatian Soccer Tournament being the forerunners in getting the tournament up and going. The second tournament was staged in 1975, hosted by Sydney Croatia and taken out by Canberra FC who defeated Sydney Croatia 3–1 in the Final. Since then it has gone on to become the largest and oldest ethnic football tournament in Australia, having been hosted in every state and territory except for the Northern Territory. It also holds the honour of being the oldest national soccer competition still running in Australia. 
Melbourne Knights and Sydney United are the only two clubs to hold Life Membership to the Australian Croatian Soccer Federation due to their pioneering in the early days in getting the tournament going, as well as their success on the National footballing stage.

List of Tournaments

^ 1974 Tournament was a trial event

Tournament Winners

St Albans Saints, 10 titles
Sydney United, 9 titles
Melbourne Knights, 7 titles
Canberra FC, 6 titles
Adelaide Raiders, 5 titles
Dandenong City, 1 title
North Geelong Warriors, 1 title
Whyalla Croatia, 1 title
Western Knights, 1 title
Ljubuski FC, 1 title
Hajduk Sydney, 1 title
O'Connor Knights, 1 title
Auckland Croatia, 1 title
Brisbane Knights, 1 title

See also

List of Croatian football clubs in Australia
Croatian Australian

References

(1) Adelaide Advertiser "Raiders confident" 4 October 2002, page 103

Official website AusCroSoccer.com

Croatian-Australian culture
Recurring sporting events established in 1974
Soccer cup competitions in Australia